Daniel Munch House is a historic home and farm located near Fort Valley, Shenandoah County, Virginia. It was built in 1834, and is a two-story, five bay, brick I-house dwelling in a vernacular late-Federal style.   It has a -story two-room brick rear ell, with a partially exposed basement and a wraparound porch.  Also on the property are the contributing bank barn (c. 1929), frame tool shed, equipment or vehicle shed with attached corn crib, livestock shed, and the Ridenour family cemetery.

It was listed on the National Register of Historic Places in 2002.

References

Houses on the National Register of Historic Places in Virginia
Farms on the National Register of Historic Places in Virginia
Federal architecture in Virginia
Houses completed in 1834
Houses in Shenandoah County, Virginia
National Register of Historic Places in Shenandoah County, Virginia